Below are the squads for the 2011 VFF Cup, hosted by Vietnam, which took place between 19 and 23 October 2011.

Vietnam 
Coach:  Falko Götz

Uzbekistan 
Coach: Vadim Abramov

Malaysia 
Coach: Ong Kim Swee

Myanmar 
Coach:  Stefan Hansson

References

External links 
 Official website

squads